Vartak Nagar is a Hindi language drama film directed by Atul Taishete.

Concept
The primary layer is a fun-filled nostalgic trip of the 80’s, the glorious school days, the eccentric teachers, and the school pranks. The innocence of that age is captured through the carefree lives of Gajya, Satya, Raju and Savio. They live in Vartak Nagar which is located in Mumbai and attend an English medium school. The fathers of Raju and Satya work in Sitaram mills.
  
The second layer, which follows the animosity between the don BalaChavan and union leader Kunwar Singh, is a look at the gangster era in the 80s in the city of Mumbai. Bala Chavan is the ferocious gangster working for the mill ownerandKunwar Singhis an honest mill union leader who fights for the rights of workers.

Violent clashes between Bala Chavan and Kunwar Singh lead to an event which changes the lives of the four children protagonists. The boys suddenly find themselves in adult-like situations and evolve as true and lifelong friends in the process.

The Bombay mill strike of 1982 is the driver for the story of Vartak Nagar. The catalyst used to make these two worlds collide is the historical Textile mill strike of Mumbai, considered the one landmark event which transformed Mumbai from an Industrial town to a commercial city.

The film is an entertaining roller coaster ride and promises to help us relive our carefree childhood days. The film also takes a hard look at how a seemingly small event snowballed into the longest running strike in history eventually converting the textile mills into swanky malls in the city of Mumbai two decades later.

Vartak Nagar is a funny and violent "Coming of age period film" about the childhood we share, the trust we take for granted, the promises we break and evolve as true friends in the process.

The film was screened at Cinequest Film Festival (San Jose, California) and received a great response.

Cast
 Jimmy Shergill as Bala Chavan 
 Raghu Ram as Kunwar Singh 
 Shweta Gulati as Mona alias Lal Pari
 Jayesh Kardak as Satyanarayan Moorthy  alias Satya
 Ashitosh Gaikwad as Raju Thorat
 Shantnu Rangnaker as Gajanan Shenoy alias Gajya
 Mohak Meet as Savio Fernandes

Takes
'ATUL TAISHETE’s TAKE (Director)'
Vartak Nagar tries to create the Bomaby of the 80s while attempting to mix genres ranging from a coming of age action film to a gangster drama while trying to trace the history of how the industrial town of Mumbai became the commercial hub called Bombay.

'AMIT AGARWAL’s TAKE (Producer)'
Vartak Nagar is one of those rare films which has the potential to be a huge commercial hit, garner critical acclaim and also perform well internationally. I had absolutely no hesitation in backing the film.

'JIMMY SHEIRGILL’s TAKE (Actor)'
The character of Bala Chavan was amazingly well fleshed out and something which I had never done before. I really enjoyed bringing out the menace of Bala Chavan on screen.

'RAGHU RAM’s TAKE (Actor)'
The character of Kunwar Singh as an honest and upright union leader with a heart of gold attracted me to Vartak Nagar. I love the way Kunwar Singh has been portrayed as a man with the right amount of empathy and toughness.

References

 
 
 
 

2010s Hindi-language films
Indian drama films